Happy Secret is the fifth album by The Lucksmiths released in 1999 on Candle Records (catalogue number LUCKY6.) It is compilation of the tracks from four singles released in 1998.

Track listing
"Untidy Towns" – 2:56
"Pin Cushion" – 2:52
"Edward, Sandwich Hand" – 2:29
"Abdication!" – 3:08
"The Art of Cooking for Two" – 2:20
"Don't Come with Me" – 2:12
"A Great Parker" – 4:22
"Southernmost" – 2:37
"Beer Nut" – 2:51
"Paper Planes" – 1:55

References

1999 compilation albums
The Lucksmiths albums